David Finch may refer to: 

 David Finch (comics), comic book artist
 David Finch (rugby league), rugby league footballer of the 1970s and 1980s
 David Finch (True Blood), a fictional character in the TV series

See also
 David Fincher (born 1962), American film director
 Finch (surname)